Palmas Del Espino Airport  is an airport serving the oil palm plantations of Palmas del Espino S.A. in the San Martín Region of Peru. The airport is midway between the towns of Tocache and Uchiza.

See also

Transport in Peru
List of airports in Peru

References

External links
OpenStreetMap - Palmas Del Espino
OurAirports - Palmas Del Espino
SkyVector - Palmas Del Espino
Palmas Del Espino Airport
Palmas del Espino S.A. Company profile

Airports in Peru
Buildings and structures in San Martín Region